Pamela Bauer Mueller (September 14, 1945) is an American writer of historical novels and children's books.

Early life and education
Bauer-Mueller was born in Chicago, Illinois, on September 14, 1945. She was raised in North Bend and Klamath Falls, Oregon. She graduated from Lewis & Clark College in Portland, Oregon, with a degree in Spanish.

Biography
Bauer-Mueller worked for two years as a flight attendant for Pan American Airlines. She left Pan American and married Mexican architect Eduardo Gual. The couple lived in Mexico City for eighteen years. Pamela and Eduardo have two children, Cassandra and Ticiana. She brought her daughters to San Diego, California, in 1986, where they lived for the next eight years. Bauer-Mueller worked as a model, an actress, and an English and Spanish language instructor during her time in Mexico.

After returning to the United States, she became an officer for the U.S. Customs Service, working for twelve years in San Diego, California, and then moving to Vancouver, British Columbia, Canada. She worked on this foreign assignment for five more years.

In 1995, Bauer-Mueller married Michael Mueller. They met while training for the U.S. Customs Service. Bauer-Mueller took early retirement from the government to write her first children's book, following her husband back to Georgia for his instructor position at the Federal Law Enforcement Training Center. They now reside in Jekyll Island, Georgia.

Books
Bauer-Mueller has written The Kiska Trilogy; Hello, Goodbye, I Love You; Neptune's Honor, An Angry Drum Echoed, Aloha Crossing, Splendid Isolation, Water to My Soul, Lady Unveiled, The Dancing Delilahs, A Shadow of Hope; Fly, Fly Away; and The Sky Is My Home in Georgia.

Starting with Neptune's Honor: A Story of Loyalty and Love (2004), Bauer Mueller has written various historical novels.

Recognition
Her books have won awards at the San Francisco Book Festival, New York Book Festival, Paris Book Festival, New England Book Festival, Great Southeast Book Festival, and many other book festivals.

Bibliography
Bauer Mueller, Pamela (2023). The Sky Is My Home (forthcoming, January 2023). ISBN 978-0980916379
Bauer Mueller, Pamela (2020). Fly, Fly Away. ISBN 978-0980916362
Bauer Mueller, Pamela (2018). A Shadow of Hope. ISBN 978-0980916355
Bauer Mueller, Pamela (2016). The Dancing Delilahs (out of print). ISBN 978-0980916348
Bauer Mueller, Pamela (2014). Lady Unveiled. ISBN 978-0980916331
Bauer Mueller, Pamela (2012). Water To My Soul. ISBN 978-0980916317
Bauer Mueller, Pamela (2010). Splendid Isolation. ISBN 978-0980916300
Bauer Mueller, Pamela (2008). Aloha Crossing. ISBN 978-0968509791
Bauer Mueller, Pamela (2007). An Angry Drum Echoed. ISBN 978-0968509784
Bauer Mueller, Pamela (2005). Neptune's Honor. ISBN 978-0968509753
Bauer Mueller, Pamela (2003). Hello, Goodbye, I Love You. ISBN 978-0968509739
Bauer Mueller, Pamela (2001). Eight Paws to Georgia. ISBN 978-0968509722
Bauer Mueller, Pamela (2000). Rain City Cats. ISBN 978-0968509715
Bauer Mueller, Pamela (1999). The Bumpedy Road. ISBN 978-0968509708

References

External links
Official website

1945 births
Living people
Writers from Chicago
Lewis & Clark College alumni
People from Mexico City